Talbot House may refer to:

 Talbot House: a house of Worksop College, England.
 Toc H, nickname for Talbot House, in Poperinge, Belgium; set up by Chaplains Tubby Clayton and Neville Talbot in 1915 as a rest centre for Allied soldiers in World War I.